= Sheikh Public Library =

- 9°55′45″N 45°11′30″E
- Location: Sheikh, Somaliland
- Established: April 2021; 5 years ago

Sheikh Public Library is the only public library in Sheikh, Somaliland. The library was opened in January 2023.
